Mohammad Radvand, born in 1956, also known as Michael Radvand, is an Iranian modernist artist. Radvand's works have been featured in galleries both in the United States and Iran, such as the 
Tehran Museum of Contemporary Art and  Tehran Art Center.

References 

Iranian artists